SKY is an acronym used to refer to the three most prestigious universities in South Korea: Seoul National University, Korea University, and Yonsei University. The term is widely used in South Korea, both in media and by the universities themselves.

Admission to one of the SKY colleges is frequently seen as defining one's career and social position in South Korea.  Many of South Korea's most influential politicians, lawyers, physicians, engineers, journalists, professors, and policymakers (bureaucrats) have graduated from one of the SKY universities.

Members

History
1885: Former Institute of Severance Medical College and Hospital (later part of Yonsei University) was established. First modern hospital and academic institution built in Korea.
1895: Former Institute of Seoul National University College of Law was established.
1905: Bosung College established
1915: Yonhi College established
1924: Headquarters and preparatory departments of Keijō Imperial University was founded by Japan. This university is the main predecessor to Seoul National University.
1926: Three Departments (Law, Medical Sciences, and Human Sciences) of Keijō Imperial University were opened by Japan. These were the first official higher education institution during the Colonial period. This university was the only university in Korea at the time due to oppression by Japan. The Japanese government did not approve the establishment of any university except Keijō Imperial University.
1946 August: Seoul National University founded by merging several Japanese institutions of higher education around Seoul,  including Keijō Imperial University
1946 August: Bosung College renamed Korea University
1946 August: Yonhi College upgraded to  Yonhi University
1957 January: Severance Medical College and Hospital and Yonhi University merged into Yonsei University

National recognition
In 2010, it was reported that 46.3% of high government officials and 50% of CEOs of major financial industries were graduates of SKY universities. Also, over 60% of the students who passed the 2010 Korean Bar examination were graduates of SKY universities.
Being admitted in one of these universities typically requires students to be within the top 1% of the Korean College Scholastic Ability Test.

Concerns
There have been a number of SKY university students who have dropped out of school to protest against South Korea's overheated academic elitism.

In popular culture
 SKY Castle, a 2018–2019 JTBC Friday-Saturday prime time drama, explores the employment of coordinators by parents who wishes their children to enter one of the three colleges, which sometimes does not come without consequences.
 In the visual novel game Mystic Messenger, main character Yoosung Kim is a student at a school dubbed "SKY University".

See also
 Korea University–Yonsei University rivalry
 Oxbridge, referring to the UK's oldest universities, Oxford and Cambridge
 Golden triangle, informal grouping of universities in London and southeast England
 Ivy League, formal grouping of elite older private universities in the United States
Big Three, informal term grouping Harvard, Yale, and Princeton  
TU9, alliance of nine leading Technical Universities in Germany
 Group of Eight, a group of Australia's top research universities
National Institutes of Technology, 31 leading public engineering universities in India
 Imperial Universities, grouping of elite older universities in Japan
 Double First Class Universities, Chinese state's formal grouping of elite universities in China

References

Further reading 
 Jambor, Paul Z, "Why South Korean Universities Have Low International Rankings", Academic Leadership: Volume 7, Issue 1, February 20, 2009
 Jambor, Paul Z, "Why South Korean Universities Have Low International Rankings - Part II: The Student Side of the Equation", Academic Leadership: Volume 7, Issue 3, August 10, 2009
 Park, Chung-a, "Students Hold Anti-Exam Festival", The Korea Times, November 24, 2005, retrieved December 18, 2005

 
Colloquial terms for groups of universities and colleges
Seoul National University
Korea University
Yonsei University
Universities and colleges in Seoul